The Battle of Strasburg was a relatively minor engagement in the American Civil War when a small Union force of New Jersey infantry delayed three Confederate divisions from the army of Jubal A. Early at Strasburg, Virginia.

Battles of the Eastern Theater of the American Civil War
Union victories of the American Civil War
Battle of Strasburg
Battles of the American Civil War in Virginia
August 1864 events
1864 in Virginia